Malcolm "Mal" Baird (born 6 July 1948) is an Australian hurdler. He competed in the men's 110 metres hurdles at the 1972 Summer Olympics.

References

External links
 

1948 births
Living people
Athletes (track and field) at the 1972 Summer Olympics
Australian male hurdlers
Olympic athletes of Australia
Place of birth missing (living people)
Commonwealth Games medallists in athletics
Commonwealth Games silver medallists for Australia
Athletes (track and field) at the 1970 British Commonwealth Games
20th-century Australian people
21st-century Australian people
Medallists at the 1970 British Commonwealth Games